Rhosus may refer to:

Places and jurisdictions 
 Arsuz (Arsûs), formerly known as Rhosus, a coastal town in Hatay Province, Asian Turkey, 
 the former Diocese of Rhosus, with see in the above city in Cilicia Secunda, now a Latin Catholic titular see
 a place on the Pierian coast in Macedonia

Other uses 
  (1986), a Moldovan-flagged cargo ship whose abandoned ammonium nitrate cargo fueled the 2020 Beirut explosions
 Rhosus (moth), a moth genus